Francisca Steverlynck (born 8 April 1974) is an Argentine alpine skier. She competed in three events at the 1994 Winter Olympics.

She graduated as an architect at FADU - UBA (Facultad de Arquitectura y Urbanismo Universidad de Buenos Aires) in 2000. She established Steverlynck+Iglesias Molli Arquitectos (SIM Arquitectos) in 2011 in Buenos Aires, Argentina.

References

External links
 

1974 births
Living people
Argentine female alpine skiers
Olympic alpine skiers of Argentina
Alpine skiers at the 1994 Winter Olympics
Skiers from Buenos Aires